The Burke Ministry was the 29th Ministry of the Government of Western Australia, led by Labor Premier Brian Burke and deputy Mal Bryce. It commenced on 25 February 1983, six days after the O'Connor ministry, led by Premier Ray O'Connor of the Liberal Party, was defeated at the 1983 election. It was followed by the Dowding Ministry upon Burke's retirement as Premier on 25 February 1988.

Most of its members followed on from the Burke shadow ministry which had functioned since September 1981.

Overview
At first, the Burke Ministry utilised roles which were largely inherited from the previous Government. As the government had come to power at a time of economic recession, it commissioned a State Employment Task Force under the direction of Dr John Wood to review the machinery of government. An earlier report commissioned by the previous government on mining and resource development had highlighted interdepartmental conflicts in these areas. On the basis of these, a major reshuffle took place on 23 December with no changes of personnel, although several roles were abolished and new ones created, and Arthur Tonkin, who was said to have presented "too hardline an image" in his dealings with business, was relieved of Consumer Affairs. Another reshuffle occurred on 22 March 1985.

The Ministry was reconstituted on 26 February 1986 following the 1986 election, due in part to the defeat of one minister, Ken McIver (MLA for Avon), and the decisions of Ron Davies and David Evans to stand down. At this point, two honorary Ministers were appointed, including Ernie Bridge, to assist ministers in a number of portfolios. On 25 July 1986, they were both promoted to full Ministers, making Bridge the first ever Aboriginal Cabinet minister in Australia.

First Ministry

On 25 February 1983, the Governor, Sir Richard Trowbridge, designated 15 principal executive offices of the Government under section 43(2) of the Constitution Acts Amendment Act 1899. The following ministers were then appointed to the positions, and served until the reconstitution of the Ministry on 26 February 1986.

The list below is ordered by decreasing seniority within the Cabinet, as indicated by the Government Gazette and the Hansard index.

 On 25 March 1983, David Evans became, in addition to his earlier responsibilities, Minister assisting the Minister for Forests.
 On 22 April 1983, Joe Berinson's responsibilities were amended. The historic position of Chief Secretary was abolished, with those responsibilities passing to the Minister of Planning and Administrative Services. Berinson, meanwhile, added Minister for Prisons to his earlier responsibilities.
 On 3 June 1983, David Parker's responsibilities were amended, with Planning and Administrative Services becoming Planning, and Employment becoming Employment and Administrative Services.

Second Ministry
On 26 February 1986, the Governor, Gordon Reid, appointed the new Ministry. He designated 15 principal executive offices of the Government and appointed the following ministers to the positions, who served until the Dowding Ministry was established on 26 February 1988. Three of the members were new to the Ministry, and two additional honorary members were also appointed to assist specific Ministers. One of these was Australia's first ever Aboriginal Cabinet minister, Ernie Bridge. These honorary ministers were elevated to ministerial posts following the assent of the Constitution Amendment Act 1986 (No.10 of 1986) on 22 July 1986, which officially grew the Ministry from 15 to 17 members.

The members of the Second Ministry were:

 On 12 May 1986, Arthur Tonkin, the minister for Police and Emergency Services and Water Resources, resigned from the Ministry. In the resulting reshuffle, Gavan Troy, previously an Honorary Minister, was appointed to the Ministry, whilst Gordon Hill was made an honorary minister.
  On 25 July 1986, the Ministry was officially expanded to 17, with the two Honorary Ministers assuming the portfolios they had previously assisted.
  On 16 March 1987, Des Dans resigned from the Ministry, and fellow MLC Graham Edwards was appointed in his place. Kay Hallahan was promoted in seniority from 14th to 4th within the Cabinet.

References
 Hansard Indexes for 1983-1985, "Legislature of Western Australia"
 
 
 
 
 
 
 
 

Western Australian ministries
Australian Labor Party ministries in Western Australia
Ministries of Elizabeth II